The Midwest Football Conference was a football conference for NJCAA teams located in the midwest United States. It was formed when the North Central Community College Conference merged with the Iowa Conference in 2005.

The conference dissolved following the 2013 season after almost all of the East Division schools, except the College of DuPage, dropped football. The Iowa schools, Ellsworth Community College, Iowa Central Community College and Iowa Western Community College, formed a scheduling alliance with the Kansas Jayhawk Community College Conference. The two North Dakota schools joined the Minnesota Community College Conference in football only while DuPage became an independent.

Grand Rapids, Harper, Joliet, Rock Valley and North Iowa Area no longer field teams.

Former members
East division

West division

External links
 Midwest Football Conference

NJCAA conferences
College football-only conferences in the United States
Sports in the Midwestern United States